Claudia Melchers (born 6 May 1969, Ruurlo) is the Dutch head of a cooking company called CMC Catering. She is the daughter of Hans Melchers, a wealthy Dutch businessman.

Kidnapping
On 12 September 2005 a group of three armed South-American men broke into her home in Amsterdam, tied her and packed her into a plastic crate, and then forced her into a waiting vehicle. The intruders left her two children unharmed. They also bound and gagged a male neighbor present at the time, but her children freed the neighbor shortly before police arrived.

The abductors took Melchers to a bungalowpark in the eastern part of the Netherlands. She was held captive in one of the bungalows. After the case got so much media attention, Melchers was dropped off unharmed at the Arnhem train station within 48 hours. No reason was given for her release, and it is unclear whether a ransom was paid.

The abductors reportedly demanded 660 pounds of cocaine. After the release of this fact, several Dutch Radio and Television stations speculated that the reason for the kidnapping was an error with a drug deal, and that the abductors were in quick need of cocaine. The stations claimed that they got their information from the police. The above-mentioned media also speculated that Melchers' family is involved in the drug scene. Melchers' father - Hans Melchers - denied any of these connections and announced that he is going to sue several newspapers and television programs that launched this rumor.

Lorenzo Moeniralam, one of the abductors of Melchers, was sentenced to eight years in prison in 2007. Later that year his nephew Izaan M. was sentenced to ten years. Three others involved earlier received prison sentences from 2 to 6 years.

Kidnap cases in the Netherlands 
Other famous kidnappings in the Netherlands are:
Freddy Heineken (1983)
Gerrit Jan Heijn (1987)
Derk Bolt (2017)

Notes

External links
 CMC Catering homepage

1969 births
Formerly missing people
Living people
Kidnapped Dutch people
People from Berkelland